Hail Mary is a 1985 French erotic drama film written and directed by Jean-Luc Godard. The film is a modern retelling of the story of the virgin birth. It was entered into the 35th Berlin International Film Festival.

Plot
Marie, a student, works at her father's Swiss gas station and plays basketball for a local team; she claims to be a virgin and maintains a chaste relationship with her boyfriend Joseph, a taxi cab driver and college dropout. Joseph remains loyal to Marie even though she will not sleep with him, and another girl, Juliette, entreats him to be with her. When a passing stranger named Uncle Gabriel (who arrives by jet plane and is accompanied by a small girl who acts as his secretary) informs Marie that she will become pregnant despite remaining chaste, she is at first shocked and confused. For his part, Joseph cannot believe that Marie can be pregnant and a virgin, so he accuses her of sleeping around. Gabriel aggressively schools Joseph to accept Marie's pregnancy, while Marie comes to terms with God's plan through meditations that are sometimes angry and usually punctuated by elemental images of the sun, moon, clouds, flowers, and water.

In a parallel narrative, Eva, a college student, gets involved with her professor, who theorizes that life on earth arose from a guided extraterrestrial intelligence. Unlike Marie, who does not allow Joseph to touch her sexually, Eva has an affair with her professor, who ultimately leaves her to go back east to his family, leaving her distraught.

With Gabriel's help, Marie teaches Joseph to "touch" her without touching her. Joseph pledges to act as Marie's shadow, to which she responds, "But isn't that what all men are, the shadow of God?"  Alone, Marie wrestles with and then gives herself over to the divine process of her pregnancy. Joseph and Marie are wed and she gives birth to a son. Together they raise the boy, who eventually leaves his family to pursue "his father's business." In the end, Marie explores her sexuality, seeking to link her body and spirit.

Cast
 Myriem Roussel as Marie
 Thierry Rode as Joseph
 Philippe Lacoste as L'ange Gabriel
 Manon Andersen as La petite fille
 Juliette Binoche as Juliette
 Anne Gautier as Eva

Background
The point of departure for the film was a book by Françoise Dolto, the popular French pediatrician and psychoanalyst, called L'Évangile au risque de la psychanalyse.

Release 
The film was first released in France on 23 January 1985. It was entered into the 35th Berlin International Film Festival. All screenings in its initial theatrical distribution were accompanied by the short film The Book of Mary by Godard's longtime companion and collaborator Anne-Marie Miéville.

The film receives home media release from the Cohen Media. The blu-ray package follows this tradition and places The Book of Mary right before Hail Mary.

Reception
Hail Marys religious themes and scenes of full frontal nudity offended some Christians. Pope John Paul II criticized the film saying that it "deeply wounds the religious sentiments of believers." Protesters showed up at some theaters on opening night, and its premiere screening at the Sydney Film Festival was disrupted by protestors and a bomb threat that caused the theatre to be evacuated. The film had only 353,877 admissions in French movie theaters. It was banned in Argentina and Brazil (where the movie was banned until 1988).

Hail Mary received mixed reviews, including one in the New York Times that characterized the film as "not especially provocative or entertaining", but also called it "an utterly serious attempt to examine the nature of relations between women and men and the possibility of profound friendships not based on sex. It's also about the demands of faith, which, in this time of cynicism, may be the most truly controversial aspect of the movie." Many other serious critics were more favourable: Time Out said "Composed like a brilliant mosaic, Godard's film gives fresh meaning to everyday images; makes us listen to Dvořák with renewed appreciation; and shows the female nude as though never filmed before." Channel 4 Film's critic wrote "The Virgin Birth is presented as a reality - the mystery for Godard being womanhood and birth in general. This he explores through stunning images of nature and the nude figure of his heroine - the latter photographed chastely without voyeurism or sexism, after certain classic paintings." Filmmaker John Waters wrote a highly favorable review that was included in his book Crackpot. In contrast, writer and director James Gunn claims it is his least favorite film he has seen.

At the Cannes Film Festival, Noël Godin, disappointed that Godard, in his opinion, made a religious film, threw a shaving cream pie into Godard's face, making international news. Under heavy criticism, Godard attempted to withdraw the film from Italy, but his distributor was unable to do so. He also claimed that the film is not about the Virgin Mary, but about "a young woman named Mary who, at a certain moment in her life, finds herself part of an exceptional event that she would never have wished for herself." Despite the initial heavy criticism, the film has also been praised for its beautiful cinematography.

Hail Mary currently holds a 70% rating on Rotten Tomatoes based on 10 reviews.

References

External links

1985 films
1980s erotic drama films
Censored films
1980s French-language films
French avant-garde and experimental films
Erotic fantasy films
Films about the Nativity of Jesus
Films directed by Jean-Luc Godard
Portrayals of the Virgin Mary in film
Films set in Switzerland
French pregnancy films
1980s avant-garde and experimental films
French erotic drama films
1985 drama films
Film controversies in France
Film controversies in Argentina
Film controversies in Brazil
Obscenity controversies in film
Religious controversies in film
Religious controversies in France
Religious controversies in Brazil
Religious controversies in Argentina
1980s French films